Spittal an der Drau (Slovenian: Špital ob Dravi) is a town in the western part of the Austrian federal state of Carinthia. It is the administrative centre of Spittal an der Drau District, Austria's second largest district (Bezirk) by area.

Geography

The town is located on the southern slopes of the Gurktal Alps (Nock Mountains), between the Lurnfeld Basin and the Lower Drau Valley. Despite its name, the historic core of Spittal originated on the banks of the small Lieser tributary, which flows into the Drau at the foot of Mt. Goldeck, a peak of the Gailtal Alps south of the town. Its summit can be reached by cable car.

The municipal area consists of seven Katastralgemeinden: Amlach, Edling, Großegg, Molzbichl, Olsach, Spittal proper, and St. Peter-Edling. In Großegg (incorporated in 1973), the area of Spittal extends to the southern shore of Lake Millstatt.

History
The settlement was first mentioned in an 1191 deed issued by Archbishop Adalbert of Salzburg, when the local Carinthian counts Hermann I and Otto II of Ortenburg had a hospital (Spittl) with a chapel built where the ancient road leading to the Katschberg Pass and Salzburg crossed the Lieser river. The adjacent settlement received market rights in 1242. Together with the Ortenburg estates, Spittal in 1418 was inherited by Count Hermann II of Celje. The Counts of Cilli, raised to immediate Reichsgrafen in 1436, became extinct when Count Ulrich II was killed by the liegemen of László Hunyadi in 1456, after which the Habsburg emperor Frederick III, also Duke of Carinthia, seized his territory.

Frederick granted the citizens the right to choose their own judge and the council. However, Spittal and the surrounding lands were devastated by Turkish warriors in 1478 and shortly afterwards occupied by the Hungarian troops of Emperor Frederick's long-time rival King Matthias Corvinus. Further ravaged by a peasant's revolt and two fires in 1522 and 1729, the decline continued, until in 1524 Archduke Ferdinand I of Austria entrusted his treasurer Gabriel von Salamanca (1489–1539) with the former Ortenburg county.

From 1533 onwards, the Counts of Salamanca-Ortenburg had Schloss Porcia erected on the main square as their residence. The building in the style of an Italian palazzo is considered one of the most important Renaissance castles in Austria. They also rebuilt the Spittl hospital on the other side of the Lieser River and the late Gothic Catholic parish church of Mary's Annunciation upon Romanesque foundations of the 13th century. In 1662 Spittal passed to the Gorizia Counts of Porcia, owners of Schloss Porcia until 1918. Today the palace hosts an annual festival for classic theatrical comedies (Komödienspiele Porcia) and is also home of a museum of local history. In 1537 the Carinthian Khevenhüller noble family had a residence erected opposite the castle, nowadays serving as the town hall.

In 1797 Spittal was sieged by French troops in the course of the Napoleonic War of the First Coalition, in 1809 it fell with Upper Carinthia to the French Illyrian Provinces according to the Treaty of Schönbrunn. Restored to the Austrian Empire by the 1815 Congress of Vienna, the local economy was decisively promoted, when it gained access to the Austrian Southern Railway network in 1871. During the violent fights against Yugoslav troops before the Carinthian Plebiscite in 1920, Spittal for a short time was the provisional seat of the Carinthian state government, which had fled from Klagenfurt. It formally received town privileges on the occasion of the ten-years-anniversary in 1930. Since 1995 the Spittl has been a seat of the Carinthian Fachhochschule (University of Applied Sciences) for engineering ("Technikum").

Molzbichl
East of the town, within the Drau Valley lies the village of Molzbichl, which is home to the remains of Carinthia's first monastery, established about 780 by Duke Tassilo III of Bavaria and abandoned in the 10th century. A small museum nearby shows several artifacts of Carolingian origin. The foundation of the monastery church is visible south of the present parish church Saint Tiburtius, which itself has an altar including a Roman tombstone of an Early Christian deacon Nonnosus, who died here in 532.

On a slope above the valley, northeast of Molzbichl is Schloss Rothenthurn, in the 11th century called "Red Tower" (Roter Turm), a fiefdom of the Counts of Ortenburg. The present-day palace is a building from the 17th century and serves as a hotel.

Politics

Seats in the municipal assembly (Stadtrat) as of 2009 elections:
 Social Democratic Party of Austria (SPÖ): 14
 Alliance for the Future of Austria (BZÖ): 11
 Spittal People's Party (SVP): 4
 The Greens: 1
 Freedom Party of Austria (FPÖ): 1

Notable people

 Virgil von Graben (15th century — 1507) Austrian noble and knight, stadtholder of Lienz and East Tyrol and Regent (captain) and stadtholder of Province of Gorizia (Görz). 
 Rosina von Graben von Rain zu Sommeregg, (15th century in Sommeregg - 1534) Austrian noble woman from the House of Graben von Stein a cadet branch of the Meinhardiner dynasty
 David Pacher (1816 in Obervellach – 1902) Austrian priest and botanist
 Hans Gasser (1817 in Eisentratten – 1868) painter and sculptor 
 Carl Gussenbauer (1842 in Obervellach – 1903) Austrian surgeon.
 Gustav Weindorfer (1874 in Spittal – 1932) Austrian-born Australian amateur botanist, lodge-keeper and promoter of the Cradle Mountains National Park in Tasmania
 Max Beier (1903 in Spittal – 1979) Austrian arachnologist, entomologist and specialist in pseudoscorpions
 Walter Zellot (1920 in Spittal – 1942) World War II fighter ace
 Herbert Haupt (born 1947 in Seeboden) Austrian politician, party chairman Austrian Freedom Party a veterinarian by training,

sport 

 Hans Kary (born 1949 in Spittal), former professional tennis player from Austria.
 Roland Kaspitz (born 1981 in Spittal) Austrian professional ice hockey Forward who plays for HDD Olimpija Ljubljana
 Eberhard Steinböck (born 1882 in Spittal - date of death unknown) Austrian sports shooter in the 1912 Summer Olympics
 Joachim Wendt (born 1962 in Spittal) Austrian fencer, competed at five consecutive Summer Olympics between 1984 and 2000
 Thomas Morgenstern (born 1986 in Spittal) Austrian former ski jumper who competed from 2002 to 2014
 Thomas Pirker (born 1987 in Spittal) Austrian football Defender playing for WAC St. Andrä
 Manuel Kuttin (born 1993 in Spittal) Austrian footballer who plays for Admira Wacker
 Katharina Naschenweng (born 1997 in Spittal) Austrian footballer who plays for 1899 Hoffenheim and Austria

Transportation
The city has a railway station on the Tauernbahn railway line from Villach to Salzburg. It lies also near the A10 Tauern Autobahn as well as on the Bundesstraßen highways B99 Katschberg-Straße leading to the Katschberg Pass and the B100 Drautal-Straße to Lienz in East Tyrol. A cableway runs up to Mount Goldeck (2,142 m).

International relations

Twin towns — Sister cities
Spittal an der Drau is twinned with:
 Löhne, Germany (1973)
 Pordenone, Italy (1987)
 Porcia, Italy (1987)

References

Cities and towns in Spittal an der Drau District